King Zakarine (also known as Sakkarin, Sakharine, Sackarine, Zackarine and Zacharine; originally Kham Souk, ; full name: Samdach Brhat Chao Maha Sri Vitha Lan Xang Hom Khao Luang Prabang Parama Sidha Khattiya Suriya Varman Brhat Maha Sri Sakarindra) (16 July 1840 – 25 March 1904) was the King of Luang Prabang from 1895 to 1904.

Note: The Lao spelling above would be read: Sak Rin or Sak Rin Thra

Early life
Zakarine was brought up in Luang Phrabang. He was educated privately, a privilege reserved for wealthy Lao people at the time. Later on, he married seven wives, included Queen Thongsy, and had 10 sons and 4 daughters. Thongsy was childless, so he adopted Queen Khamphane, wife of King Sisavang Vong. He commanded the Royal Forces against the Haw invasion (Chinese rebels of the Taiping rebellion) in 1874. He fled to Bangkok after the sack of Luang Prabang in 1887.

King of Luang Phrabang
In 1888, the King of Siam appointed him regent for his father. Zakarine officially succeeded his father on 15 December 1895 and was crowned at Luang Prabang on 14 July 1896. During his reign, he accepted French protectorate over the kingdom on 3 October 1893 after his father agreed to having French protection. He died from cerebral hemorrhage on 25 March 1904. He was succeeded by his son, King Sisavang Vong.

References 

Kings of Luang Phrabang
1904 deaths
1840 births
20th-century Laotian people
19th-century Laotian people